The 2023 Indiana Fever season will be the franchise's 24th season in the Women's National Basketball Association, and their first season under new Head Coach Christie Sides. 

The Fever named Sides their new head coach on November 4, 2022. She previously spent two seasons in Indiana as an assistant coach from 2018-19.

The Fever won the 2023 WNBA Draft Lottery and were awarded the first overall pick for the first time in franchise history.

Transactions

WNBA Draft

Transactions

Roster Changes

Additions

Subtractions

Roster

Schedule

Regular Season

|- 
| 1
| May 19
| Connecticut
| 
| 
| 
| 
| Gainbridge Fieldhouse
| 
|- 
| 2
| May 21
| @ New York
| 
| 
| 
| 
| Barclays Center
| 
|- 
| 3
| May 28
| @ Atlanta
| 
| 
| 
| 
| Gateway Center Arena
| 
|- 
| 4
| May 30
| @ Connecticut
| 
| 
| 
| 
| Mohegan Sun Arena
| 

|- 
| 5
| June 4
| Las Vegas
| 
| 
| 
| 
| Gainbridge Fieldhouse
| 
|- 
| 6
| June 6
| @ Chicago
| 
| 
| 
| 
| Wintrust Arena
| 
|- 
| 7
| June 9
| @ Minnesota
| 
| 
| 
| 
| Target Center
| 
|- 
| 8
| June 11
| Phoenix
| 
| 
| 
| 
| Gainbridge Fieldhouse
| 
|- 
| 9
| June 13
| Washington
| 
| 
| 
| 
| Gainbridge Fieldhouse
| 
|- 
| 10
| June 15
| @ Chicago
| 
| 
| 
| 
| Wintrust Arena
| 
|- 
| 11
| June 18
| Atlanta
| 
| 
| 
| 
| Gainbridge Fieldhouse
| 
|- 
| 12
| June 22
| @ Seattle
| 
| 
| 
| 
| Climate Pledge Arena
| 
|- 
| 13
| June 24
| @ Las Vegas
| 
| 
| 
| 
| Michelob Ultra Arena
|
|- 
| 14
| June 26
| @ Las Vegas
| 
| 
| 
| 
| Michelob Ultra Arena
| 
|- 
| 15
| June 29
| @ Phoenix
| 
| 
| 
| 
| Footprint Center
| 

|- 
| 16
| July 2
| Chicago
| 
| 
| 
| 
| Gainbridge Fieldhouse
| 
|- 
| 17
| July 5
| @ Minnesota
| 
| 
| 
| 
| Target Center
|
|- 
| 18
| July 7
| @ Washington
| 
| 
| 
| 
| Entertainment and Sports Arena
| 
|- 
| 19
| July 9
| Dallas
| 
| 
| 
| 
| Gainbridge Fieldhouse
|
|- 
| 20
| July 12
| New York
| 
| 
| 
| 
| Gainbridge Fieldhouse
|
|- 
| 21
| July 19
| Washington
| 
| 
| 
| 
| Gainbridge Fieldhouse
|
|- 
| 22
| July 23
| @ New York
| 
| 
| 
| 
| Barclays Center
|
|- 
| 23
| July 25
| @ Los Angeles
| 
| 
| 
| 
| Crypto.com Arena
|
|- 
| 24
| July 27
| @ Los Angeles
| 
| 
| 
| 
| Crypto.com Arena
|
|- 
| 25
| July 30
| Seattle
| 
| 
| 
| 
| Gainbridge Fieldhouse
|

|- 
| 26
| August 1
| Phoenix
| 
| 
| 
| 
| Gainbridge Fieldhouse
|
|- 
| 27
| August 4
| Connecticut
| 
| 
| 
| 
| Gainbridge Fieldhouse
|
|- 
| 28
| August 6
| @ Atlanta
| 
| 
| 
| 
| Gateway Center Arena
|
|- 
| 29
| August 8
| Los Angeles
| 
| 
| 
| 
| Gainbridge Fieldhouse
|
|- 
| 30
| August 10
| Minnesota
| 
| 
| 
| 
| Gainbridge Fieldhouse
|
|- 
| 31
| August 13
| New York
| 
| 
| 
| 
| Gainbridge Fieldhouse
|
|- 
| 32
| August 18
| Washington
| 
| 
| 
| 
| Gainbridge Fieldhouse
|
|- 
| 33
| August 20
| @ Phoenix
| 
| 
| 
| 
| Footprint Center
|
|- 
| 34
| August 24
| Seattle
| 
| 
| 
| 
| Gainbridge Fieldhouse
|
|- 
| 35
| August 27
| Atlanta
| 
| 
| 
| 
| Gainbridge Fieldhouse
|

|- 
| 36
| September 1
| Dallas
| 
| 
| 
| 
| Gainbridge Fieldhouse
|
|- 
| 37
| September 3
| @ Dallas
| 
| 
| 
| 
| College Park Center
|
|- 
| 38
| September 5
| Chicago
| 
| 
| 
| 
| Gainbridge Fieldhouse
|
|- 
| 39
| September 8
| @ Connecticut
| 
| 
| 
| 
| Mohegan Sun Arena
|
|- 
| 40
| September 10
| Minnesota
| 
| 
| 
| 
| Gainbridge Fieldhouse
|
|-

Standings

Statistics

Regular Season

Awards and Honors

References

External links 
 Official website of the Indiana Fever

2023 WNBA season
2023
2023 in sports in Indiana